"Middle of the Night" is a song by American singer Elley Duhé, released as a single on January 10, 2020, through Not Fit for Society and RCA Records. It was written by Duhé, Andrew Wells and Samuel Elliot Roman, based on Isaac Albéniz's 1892 composition "Asturias (Leyenda)". Although the song did not chart during its initial release, in late 2021 and 2022 it went viral on TikTok.

Background 
The song was released on January 10, 2020. Duhé parted ways with RCA the same week the song was released.

In 2022, it went viral on TikTok, resulting in the song entering charts in various countries and received millions of streams on Spotify.

Music video
The song's official music video was directed by Loris Russier and released on May 4, 2022. The first video for the song, directed by Ashley Monaé and released on January 4, 2022, was then retitled the "lyric video".

Charts

Weekly charts

Monthly charts

Year-end charts

Certifications

References

2020 singles
2020 songs
Elley Duhé songs
RCA Records singles
Songs written by Andrew Wells (record producer)
Songs written by Romans (musician)
Number-one singles in Greece